Manakkal Ayyampettai  is a village in the Tiruvarur taluk of Tiruvarur district in Tamil Nadu, India.

Demographic 

As of 2011 census, Ayyampettai had a population of 3546 with 1784 males and  1762 females. The sex ratio was 987. The literacy rate was 81.34.

Temples 

Abimuktheswarar temple

Seshapuishvarar

References 

 

Villages in Tiruvarur district